Pygmaepterys maraisi is a species of sea snail, a marine gastropod mollusk in the family Muricidae, the murex snails or rock snails.

Description

Distribution
This marine species occurs off Natal, South Africa.

References

 Vokes E.H. (1978). Muricidae (Mollusca: Gastropoda) from the eastern coast of Africa. Annals of the Natal Museum. 23(2): 375-418, pls 1-8.

Endemic fauna of South Africa
Muricidae
Gastropods described in 1978